Bryotropha sabulosella is a moth of the family Gelechiidae. It is found in North Macedonia, Greece, Cyprus, Turkey and northern Iran.

The wingspan is 11–13 mm. The forewings are dark, almost blackish brown, in the central part mixed with ochreous, orange-brown and grey. The hindwings are pale ochreous to greyish brown. Adults have been recorded on wing from June to July and from September to October, probably in two generations per year.

References

Moths described in 1905
sabulosella
Moths of Europe
Moths of Asia